Lygaeus creticus is a species of seed bug in the family Lygaeidae. It is found in areas around the Mediterranean Sea.

Taxonomy
Lygaeus creticus was first formally named in 1853 by French entomologist Hippolyte Lucas in Essai sur les animaux articulés qui habitent l'île de Crète.

Description
Both nymphs (image) and adults (image) of Lygaeus creticus are aposematically colored.

Reproduction
Egg mean clutch size has been noted as 20.7 ± 1.76 for once‐mated females. Males have been observed to harass female Lygaeus equestris.

Diet
Lygaeus creticus is phytophagous on Nerium oleander and Sorbus cretica.

References 

Lygaeidae
Insects of Europe